Albert Rust (April 4, 1870) was an American politician and slaveholder, who served as a delegate from Arkansas to the Provisional Congress of the Confederate States from 1861 to 1862. He also served as a senior officer of the Confederate States Army who commanded infantry in the Eastern, Western, and Trans-Mississippi theaters of the American Civil War.

Early life and career 
Albert Rust was born circa 1818 in Fauquier County, Virginia, to William Rust and his wife Elizabeth; his exact birth date is not known. He was admitted to the bar in 1836 and the following year moved from Virginia to Arkansas, settling in Union County, Arkansas. He bought land and a store near the river in 1837. By 1838, he held the U.S. government contract to survey land in the new state. In 1839, the county seat was moved present day Champagnolle. His storehouse there, the only suitable building, became the courthouse.

Rust then read law and was admitted to the Arkansas bar. In 1842, he won a seat in the Arkansas House of Representatives, where he was re-elected twice, and also elected 1852–1854. He ran in a special election for an open congressional seat in 1846. He won fourteen counties, yet got only third place. In 1852 he was elected Speaker Pro-Tempore of the Arkansas House of Representatives, a very powerful position. Two years later. Democrats nominated him for United States Congress. He won the general election and went to Washington, D.C.

In 1856, Rust drew public attention for his efforts to oppose Nathaniel P. Banks of Massachusetts, who appeared likely to become Speaker of the House. Banks opposed further extension of slave territory, unlike Rust and his constituents. According to the Rust family history, he introduced a resolution that he said was meant to enable a compromise in the speakership contest, but New York Tribune newspaperman Horace Greeley characterized Rust's resolution instead as an attempt to mislead the public about the principles involved and to oppose Banks's candidacy. After Congress adjourned, on the day the Tribune reached Washington, Rust accosted Greeley on the Capitol grounds and felled him with his cane. A few days later, Rust again struck Greeley again on the streets of Washington. According to longtime journalist Benjamin Perley Poore, Rust, at his arraignment in court, "appeared to glory in what he had done," after which Greeley's "more stalwart friends took care that he should not be unaccompanied by a defender when he appeared in public."

Rust showed little interest other than in military matters. He was not renominated; Edward A. Warren succeeded him. After working to regain his political reputation, Rust once again won a seat in the House of Representatives in 1858. His interest in military affairs continued in his second term. A supporter of Stephen A. Douglas in the 1860 Presidential election and strong advocate for Union, Rust shifted his position after Lincoln's call for troops. In May 1861 Arkansas seceded from the Union, and he was named a delegate to the Provisional Congress of the Confederate States.

American Civil War 

Returning to Arkansas, Rust received a commission as  colonel on July 5, 1861, and assisted Van H. Manning in recruiting and organizing the 3d Arkansas Infantry Regiment. The Third Arkansas would become Arkansas's most celebrated Civil War regiment and the only Arkansas regiment to be permanently assigned to General Robert E. Lee's Army of Northern Virginia. In the fall of 1861, Rust and the Third Arkansas traveled to Western Virginia and took part in the Battle of Cheat Mountain under Lee. During that winter, he and the regiment were under the command of General Stonewall Jackson. They would go on to serve in almost every major battle fought in the east, including the Battle of Gettysburg, although mostly after Rust's promotion and transfer from the regiment.

On March 4, 1862, Rust was promoted to brigadier-general and transferred back to Arkansas, where he was assigned to Lieutenant-General Earl Van Dorn's Army of the West. He led troops at the Battle of Hill's Plantation in July 1862. After the Battle of Pea Ridge, most Confederate States forces were removed from Arkansas and transferred east of the Mississippi River.

Rust fought at the Battle of Corinth, Mississippi in October. In April 1863, he was once again transferred back to Arkansas and placed under Major-General Sterling Price in the Trans-Mississippi Department. He later served under Major-Generals Thomas C. Hindman in Arkansas and John Pemberton and Richard Taylor in Louisiana.  After his active military service, he moved to Austin, Texas to reunite with his family, who had abandoned their home in Arkansas during the Federal occupation and spent considerable time with his brother Dr. George W. Rust in Virginia.

Later life and death 
After the war Rust moved from his home in El Dorado, Arkansas, across the Arkansas River from Little Rock. He returned to Washington as a member of the U.S. House of Representatives and was even a Republican candidate for the U.S. Senate in 1869 before Congressional Reconstruction began and former Confederates were forbidden to hold elective office and he withdrew himself from candidacy. On April 3, 1870, he died in Pulaski County, Arkansas, from a brain abscess, while his wife and children were away visiting family in Virginia. His burial place is the subject of some dispute. Contemporary accounts state that he was buried at the historic Mount Holly Cemetery in Little Rock; his old Congressional biography reports his "interment in the Old Methodist Cemetery." A new Congressional Biography reports he is buried in the Oakland and Fraternal Cemetery at Little Rock.

Personal life 
Rust married Jane Carrington (1824-1847) of Charlotte County, Virginia, on April 17, 1844, but she soon died, and was buried in Hervey Cemetery in Hempstead County, Arkansas. He then married Anne Bouldin Cabell, and at least three of their children (raised in Virginia during the American Civil War) would survive to adulthood: Julia Rust Tutwiler (1854-1923), Breckenridge Cabell Rust (1855-1892) and author Pauline Carrington Rust Bouve (1860-1928).

See also 
 List of Confederate States Army generals
 List of people from Fauquier County, Virginia
 List of speakers of the Arkansas House of Representatives

References

Further reading 

 Eicher, John H., and David J. Eicher. Civil War High Commands. Stanford, CA: Stanford University Press, 2001. .
 Sifakis, Stewart. Who Was Who in the Civil War. New York: Facts On File, 1988. .
 Warner, Ezra J. Generals in Gray: Lives of the Confederate Commanders. Baton Rouge: Louisiana State University Press, 1959. .

External links 

 
 Albert Rust at The Political Graveyard
 
 
 

Year of birth uncertain
1818 births
1870 deaths
19th-century American lawyers
19th-century American politicians
3d Arkansas Infantry Regiment (Confederate States)
American Civil War prisoners of war
American lawyers admitted to the practice of law by reading law
American planters
American slave owners
American surveyors
Arkansas lawyers
Burials in Pulaski County, Arkansas
Confederate States Army brigadier generals
Deaths from brain abscess
Infectious disease deaths in Arkansas
Democratic Party members of the United States House of Representatives from Arkansas
Deputies and delegates to the Provisional Congress of the Confederate States
Military personnel from Arkansas
Neurological disease deaths in Arkansas
People of Arkansas in the American Civil War
People from Desha County, Arkansas
People from Fauquier County, Virginia
People from Union County, Arkansas
Recipients of American presidential pardons
Speakers of the Arkansas House of Representatives